Nausena Baugh (Hindi: नौसेना बाग़) is a Naval Base located near the Anushakti Nagar in Mumbai, Maharashtra, India.

See also
 Indian Navy
 Government of India
 Centre for Airborne Systems

Buildings and structures in Mumbai